Buridrillia is a genus of sea snails, marine gastropod mollusks in the family Pseudomelatomidae.

Species
Species within the genus Buridrillia include:
 Buridrillia deroyorum Emerson & McLean, 1992
 † Buridrillia panarica (Olsson, 1942)

References

External links
 
 Bouchet, P.; Kantor, Y. I.; Sysoev, A.; Puillandre, N. (2011). A new operational classification of the Conoidea (Gastropoda). Journal of Molluscan Studies. 77(3): 273-308